Miloslav Rozner (born 29 March 1977) is a Czech politician and businessman who was a member of the Chamber of Deputies from October 2017 to October 2021.

Early career
Rozner has previously worked in a bakery and in a gas station. He went into business related to culture during the 1990s. Between 1996 and 2012 he organised 887 cultural events.

Political career
Rozner joined Freedom and Direct Democracy and became the party's spokesperson on culture, and lead candidate in South Bohemia for the 2017 legislative election. He participated in a debate held by Czech Television, where his performance was received negatively and met with laughter. He was visibly unprepared and seemed to be confused, had a problem forming a coherent sentence, wasn't paying attention to questions or what other debaters said and had problems responding. He answered most of the questions by reading prepared statements. His answer to one of the questions that received much attention was "Sure, maybe I totally disagree with you." He was eventually elected.

After his election, Rozner continued to receive a lot of attention from the media. Asked about his party's post-election strategy, he answered "I do not want to get in the middle of that, so I do not have to worry about getting out of it and saying something wrong. I do not want to influence anything, I'll see what Tomio negotiates for us".

On 22 November 2017, Rozner became a member of the Mandate and Immunity Committee.

Satire
Several quotations from Rozner from the debates went viral, and Rozner became a celebrity on social media, and the target of memes and jokes. A satirical Facebook page, Miloslav Rozner - Minister of Culture, was created soon afterwards and attracted thousands of likes within a matter of days.

A satirical website called Minister of Culture was launched at the end of October 2017, celebrating some quotes by Rozner and hosting recordings of Rozner's answers.

References

1977 births
Living people
Freedom and Direct Democracy MPs
Politicians from České Budějovice
Members of the Chamber of Deputies of the Czech Republic (2017–2021)